Edge of Sanity was a Swedish death metal band that, alongside Opeth, is commonly regarded as being the first to fuse extreme metal styles like death and black metal with progressive rock. The group was founded by Dan Swanö in 1989 and ended in 2003.

History 
Edge of Sanity began as a death metal band with their debut release Nothing but Death Remains. The band's second release, Unorthodox, with tracks like "Enigma" and "When All Is Said", showed Edge of Sanity branching out from some of the genre's conventions. The Spectral Sorrows, Until Eternity Ends, and Purgatory Afterglow continued the trend, so that by the release of Crimson (1996), Edge of Sanity was a progressive metal band. Crimson was a 40-minute concept album consisting entirely of one track, concerning a post-apocalyptic future in which mankind had lost the ability to breed. After one more album, Infernal (1997), guitarist/vocalist/songwriter Dan Swanö left Edge of Sanity, and his departure is generally associated with a decline in quality in the band's material. Swanö was replaced by Robert Karlsson, the vocalist of Pan.Thy.Monium (a side project in which Swanö was also involved), but after one more album, Cryptic, the band split up.

In 2003, Swanö revived the outfit as a one-man band (with several session musicians), and recorded a sequel to Crimson, Crimson II. Immediately after, he re-dissolved the project.

The Kur-Nu-Gi-A demo was re-released on LP in 2011, and on CD in 2012.

Members

Final line-up 
 Dan Swanö – vocals (1989–1997, 2003), keyboards (1991–1996, 2003), piano (1992–1993, 1997), guitar (1994–1997, 2003), bass (1997, 2003), drums (2003)

Previous members 
 Andreas Axelsson − guitar (1989–1999), vocals (1997)
 Sami Nerberg − guitar (1989–1999)
 Anders Lindberg − bass (1989–1999)
 Benny Larsson − drums (1989–1999)
 Robert Karlsson − vocals (1997–1999)

Timeline

Discography

Albums 
 Nothing but Death Remains (1991)
 Unorthodox (1992)
 The Spectral Sorrows (1993)
 Purgatory Afterglow (1994)
 Crimson (1996)
 Infernal (1997)
 Cryptic (1997)
 Crimson II (2003)

EPs 
 Until Eternity Ends (EP, 1994)

Demos 
 Euthanasia (1989)
 Kur-Nu-Gi-A (1990)
 The Dead (1990)
 The Immortal Rehearsals (1990)
 Dead but Dreaming (1992)
 Darkday (1993)
 Lost (1993)
 The Spectral Sorrows Demos (1993)
 Infernal Demos (1996)

Compilations 
 Evolution (1999)
 When All Is Said (2006)

Videos 
 "Black Tears" (1994) from Purgatory Afterglow
 "Uncontroll Me" (1997) from Cryptic
 Live in Norrköping 1991

External links 
 Black Mark Records
 Website

Swedish progressive metal musical groups
Swedish melodic death metal musical groups
Musical groups established in 1989
Musical groups disestablished in 2003
Black Mark Production artists